Mesastrape is a genus of moth in the family Geometridae. It was formerly considered a synonym of Erebomorpha.

Selected species
Mesastrape fulguraria (Walker, 1860)

References
Natural History Museum Lepidoptera genus database

Boarmiini
Geometridae genera